DXPW (99.1 FM), broadcasting as WBA 99.1, is a radio station owned and operated by the Western Basilan Alliance. Its studios and transmitter are located at the Municipal Government Center, Brgy. Taberlongan, Maluso.

References

Radio stations established in 2019